Larkinburg is an unincorporated community in Atchison and Jackson counties of Kansas in the United States.

History
Larkinburg was laid out in 1880.  It was named for M. E. Larkin, who owned land near the original town site.

References

Further reading

External links
 Atchison County maps: Current, Historic, KDOT
 Jackson County maps: Current, Historic, KDOT

Unincorporated communities in Atchison County, Kansas
Unincorporated communities in Jackson County, Kansas
Unincorporated communities in Kansas
1880 establishments in Kansas
Populated places established in 1880